is a Japanese former professional baseball pitcher in Nippon Professional Baseball (NPB). He played for the Taiyo Whales / Yokohama Taiyo Whales from 1967 to 1984. He won the Eiji Sawamura Award in 1970.

References

1947 births
Living people
Baseball people from Okayama Prefecture
Nippon Professional Baseball pitchers
Japanese baseball players
Taiyō Whales players
Yokohama Taiyō Whales players
Japanese Baseball Hall of Fame inductees